Babil Sport Club, is an Iraqi football club based in Babil, that plays in Iraq Division One.

History
Babil Sport Club was founded in 1960. The team has played in the Iraqi Premier League since the start of the tournament in 1974, and They had played for four seasons, and in all of them it had been struggling to stay away from relegation. In the end, they were relegated to the Iraq Division One in the 1978 season. The team returned after eleven seasons, but quickly relegated at the end of the season again.

In the 1993–94 season, originally, the Iraq Youth Team participated in the league. Their record was 25 games, 8 wins, 8 draws, 9 losses, 33 goals scored, 29 goals conceded and 24 points. At the halfway stage of the season, they were replaced by Babil, and Babil adopted the Youth Team's record at that point. In the end, Babil finished before last and survived from relegation, but finally relegated the following season. After ten seasons, Babil made a comeback in the league in 2004–05 season, but, as usual, they were relegated at the end of the season.

Crest
In September 2020, Babil SC announced its new logo through its media office, marking a new era for Babylonian football, which has a long history of active participation in the Iraqi Premier League. The announcement of the club’s new logo, which symbolizes the city's historical civilization, coincides with their preparations for the Iraq Division One that qualifies for the Premier League.

Current squad

First-team squad

Managerial history
  Kadhim Mutashar
  Thair Ahmed
  Maitham Dael-Haq
  Haider Al-Mulla
  Ali Wahab
  Fouad Jawad
  Hazem Saleh
  Jassim Jabor

Famous players
Razzaq Farhan
Ihsan Bahiya

See also 
 2021–22 Iraq FA Cup

References

External links
 Iraq Clubs- Foundation Dates

1960 establishments in Iraq
Association football clubs established in 1960
Football clubs in Babil